Ulla Virtanenis a Finnish actress, comedian and improviser. In the years between 2015 and 2017 she performed with Me Naiset in the talk show Evek Talk show with Niina Lahtinen and Veera Korhonen. She also works as a professional improviser in Improvisaatioryhmä VSOP.

Virtanen worked from 2011 to 2012 as a producer and radio personality of NRJ's Aamupojat. She has been heard in YleX on Sundays in the programme Suorana: Virtanen and as a guest in other YleX and Radio NRJ programmes. Virtanen worked in the TV2 comedy show Suorana: Kortesmäki for two seasons.

Virtanen graduated from the American Academy of Dramatic Arts(AADA) in New York City and studied improvisation at the Upright Citizens Brigade Theatre in New York and Los Angeles. She has also studied television and film production for a year at University of Westminster in London.

In 2008, Virtanen performed at the Riihimäki Theater's farce Puhtaana Käteen. She was elected to the Finnish Standup Club's Revenge of the Year finals in 2011. In 2016, Ulla Virtanen played the role of pilot in the George Brant's monologue, Grounded Siipirikko (translated by Jyri Numminen).

In the popular series ToosaTV, Virtanen has performed several different roles together with Cristal Snow and NikoLa in the Ilta-Sanomat production as well as the Fox Finland television series.

From 2016 Ulla Virtanen has also worked as a columnist for the magazine Me Naiset.

Television series

Films

References

External links
 
 

Finnish women comedians
Finnish actresses
Finnish radio presenters
Finnish women radio presenters
People from Riihimäki
1980 births
Living people